Karjan is a city and a municipality in Vadodara district in the Indian state of Gujarat. Karjan is known for Shri Shankheshwar Parshwanath Jain Tirth at Anastu and Sumeru Navkar Jain Tirth - The Golden Temple.

Demographics
As of the 2001 India census, Karjan City had a population of 30,405.  52% of the population was male, and 48% was female.  The average literacy rate is 91%, higher than the national average of 60.5% .  In Karjan City, 37% of the population is under 10 years of age.

Karjan City is divided into Juna Bazar and Nava Bazar. National Highway 48 passes through Juna Bazar.

Education
There are 21 schools in Karjan, among them are:

 Shah N.B. Sarvajanic High School
 Karjan Public School
 Sabari High School
 Dhayan Vidhayalay
 Aarya Bhumi Vidhyalaya
 Sufi Sanit Faiz Academy School (Kalla)
 New Rays English Medium School 
 Shah Engineering Classes, Karjan

Industry
From being a tribal region once, it has now developed into an industrial hub with major industrial companies setting up manufacturing bases in the region including:
 Cosmo Films Ltd
 TTK Prestige
 Tbea
 Jindal Rail
 Saurer Textile Solutions Pvt Ltd

Sports 
Munaf Patel (Indian cricketer) is from Karjan.

References

Cities and towns in Vadodara district